The 35th Annual Annie Awards, honoring the best in animation for 2007, was held on February 8, 2008, at UCLA's Royce Hall. This was the first change of venue for the awards in nine years, being held at the Alex Theatre in Glendale, California, since 1998 until last year. Ratatouille was the biggest winner, taking nine awards.

Winners and nominees
Nominations announced on December 3, 2007.

Awards

Production
Winners are listed first, highlighted in boldface, and indicated with a double dagger.

Individual achievement
Winners are listed first, highlighted in boldface, and indicated with a double dagger.

Juried awards
 Winsor McCay Award — John Canemaker, Glen Keane and John Kricfalusi
 June Foray Award — Jerry Beck
 Ub Iwerks Award — Jonathan Gay, Gary Grossman and Robert Tatsumi – Creators of Adobe Flash.
 Special Achievement — Edwin R. Leonard – Promoting the use of Linux in animation studios and video game development.
 Certificate of Merit — Marcus Adams, Joseph Baptista, Steve Gattuso, Jon Reeves, Gemma Ross and Woodbury University

Media with multiple nominations and awards

The following eighteen films and TV series received multiple nominations:

The following five films and TV series received multiple awards:

References

External links
 35th Annie Awards

2007
2007 film awards
Annie
Annie